In UK politics, the Shadow Secretary of State for Foreign, Commonwealth and Development Affairs is a position within the opposition's shadow cabinet that deals mainly with issues surrounding the Foreign Office. If elected, the person serving as shadow foreign secretary may be designated to serve as the new Foreign Secretary.

The current shadow secretary of state for foreign and Commonwealth affairs is MP David Lammy. The Shadow Secretary (usually with one or more junior shadow ministers) holds the Secretary of State for Foreign, Commonwealth and Development Affairs and other FCDO ministers to account in Parliament.

Although DFID and the role of International Development Secretary was abolished by the second Johnson government in 2020, the Shadow Secretary of State did not have responsibility for development until Lammy was appointed in November 2021. His predecessor, Lisa Nandy, served alongside the Shadow Secretary of State for International Development, Preet Gill. This however is no longer the case after the November 2021 British shadow cabinet reshuffle.

List of shadow foreign secretaries

Notes

References

Official Opposition (United Kingdom)